Phase inversion may refer to:

 Phase reversal
 Phase inversion (chemistry)